The Clapp Memorial Library is a public library in Belchertown, Massachusetts. Built in 1887 at the bequest of Belchertown native John Francis Clapp, the library is part of the Belchertown Center Historic District.  Designed by New York architect H.F. Kilburn, it is built in the form of a Latin cross and features two large, stained glass windows as well as an eighty-foot-high tower in the center of the building. Constructed by the Bartlett Brothers of Whately, MA, the building features primarily local materials, including the brownstone from Longmeadow, MA, the brick trim from Holyoke, MA, and the stained glass windows, made from sand and silica from Western Massachusetts. The first librarian was Lydia A. Barton, who served from 1887 until her death in 1911. The building is not owned or maintained by the town, but rather by the Trustees of the Library.

References

External links
 Library website
 Google news archive. Articles about the library
 Google blog search. Posts about the library

Public libraries in Massachusetts
Libraries in Hampshire County, Massachusetts